Triple Trouble: Animal Sinterklaas is a 2014 traditionally animated adventure film written and directed by Albert 't Hooft and Paco Vink in their feature film directorial debuts. An international co-production between the Netherlands and Belgium, Triple Trouble: Animal Sinterklaas was produced by the Dutch Il Luster Productions and Belgian Luna Blue Film and Vivi Film. It was released in Dutch cinemas on 8 October 2014, and in Belgium on 22 October, where it was released simultaneously in Dutch and French.

Premise 
As animals do not believe in Sinterklaas, Freddy the ferret, Cari the canary and Mosus the stick insect go on a journey to find Sinterklass and give him their Christmas list in person.

Dutch voice cast 
Hans Somers as Freddy the ferret
Georgina Verbaan as Cari the canary
Reinder van der Naalt as Mosus the stick insect
Bartho Braat as Bello
Kasper van Kooten as Rat

Production 
Albert 't Hooft and Paco Vink founded their own film studio, Anikey Studios, in 2007 upon realising that there was a lack of Dutch animation studios. Commissioned animators, Il Luster Productions approached them in 2008 to direct and write the film. Il Luster Productions' Arnoud Rijken and Michiel Snijders acted as producers. In order to improve their storytelling skills and build a team of animators, 't Hooft and Vink created with il Luster Productions two 10-minute short films and the 25-minute Paul and the Dragon. With a budget of €1.7 million for Triple Trouble: Animal Sinterklaas, 't Hooft stated "I don’t want to be too proud of that since it isn’t realistic. The last six months we ['t Hooft and Vink] practically worked for free because there was more to be done than we anticipated."

Release 
Triple Trouble: Animal Sinterklaas was released in Dutch cinemas on 8 October 2014 by A-Film Distribution. It was released in Belgium on 22 October by Kinepolis Film Distribution, simultaneously in Dutch and French. In Belgium, it grossed $352,618 from 485 screens.

References

External links 
 (in Dutch; archived)

Triple Trouble: Animal Sinterklaas at Movie Meter—Dutch film database (in Dutch)

2014 films
2014 animated films
2014 directorial debut films
2010s Dutch-language films
2010s children's animated films
Dutch animated films
Dutch children's films
Dutch adventure films
Sinterklaas films